The Ecuador men's national volleyball team represents Ecuador in international volleyball competitions and friendly matches.

Squads
 Squad at the 2009 Bolivarian Games.
Head Coach:

References
 CSV

Volleyball
National men's volleyball teams
Men's sport in Ecuador